Royal Dornoch Golf Club is a golf club in Dornoch, Sutherland, Scotland. It is generally referred to as Royal Dornoch. The club has two 18-hole courses: the Championship Course and the Struie Course. The older Championship Course is a links course located on the Dornoch Firth.

Royal Dornoch has never hosted any of the modern professional tournaments. The British Amateur Championship was held there in 1985 and the Scottish Amateur in 1993, 2000, and 2012. The Women's and Men's Senior Amateur championships will be held at Royal Dornoch in 2022.

The Championship Course was ranked No. 3 on the 2007 Golf Digest list of Top 100 International (outside U.S.) courses. David Brice, of Golf International, called it the "king of Scottish links courses".

The internationally renowned Championship Course at Royal Dornoch Golf Club was named No. 1 in the world by the online golf reservation service golfscape.

History
Golf was played in Dornoch, over the extensive linksland there, in the early seventeenth century, circa 1616. Expenses covering the cost of a young aristocrat's golf clubs in 1616 have provided the earliest evidence so far of the sport's presence in Dornoch. John, the 13th Earl of Sutherland, was sent to the town in Sutherland to be educated. The reference was uncovered by researcher Wade Cormack, who is a PhD student at the University of the Highlands and Islands. The current golf club was established  in 1877, and was awarded its royal status in 1906 by King Edward VII. 

The design of the Championship Course is attributed to Old Tom Morris. Several of the original holes were lost to the construction of an airfield during World War II. After the war, George Duncan was commissioned to restore and extend the course over newly acquired land. The work introduced the present 6th through 11th holes on the Championship Course.

Tom Watson is an honorary member of Royal Dornoch, and is quoted as saying of Dornoch:  "It's the most fun I've ever had on a golf course" which was the home of the course architect Donald Ross.

Members of the club traveled to the northwest United States in September 2005 for a friendly international competition and cultural exchange with the Coeur d'Alene Tribe at their Circling Raven Golf Club in northern Idaho.

Scorecard

Source:

See also
List of golf clubs granted Royal status

References

External links

Golf clubs and courses in Highland (council area)
1877 establishments in Scotland
Sports venues completed in 1877
Sport in Sutherland
Dornoch
Royal golf clubs